Tamnougalt is a kasbah and date palm oasis in the Atlas Mountains, and located in the Draa River valley in Morocco, some 75 kilometers south of Ouarzazate. The village is close to Agdz and has a famous kasbah. The Jbel Kissane rises to the north dominating the landscape. It is the former capital of the Mezguita region and residence of former caïds. Its name means 'meeting point' in Tachelhit. Each year, in the first week of October the Moussem Ellama is held, a cultural and religious festival for all villages in the neighbourhood.

History
The history of Tamnougalt is connected with that of the oasis Mezguita of which it was the capital. When it was built is unknown. Tamnougalt was possibly a garrison in the Saadian epoch. Its political and economic role began with the coming of the caid of Taleb El Hassan. He was made caid by the Alaouite sultan in the 18th century.  His sons succeeded in keeping the reign over their territory (as far as the Dades and the Ksar Ait Hammou ou Saïd) until the independence of Morocco. In 1874 the caid of Mezguita was driven out of the territory of Ouarzazat by a new caid of a family of Telouet, the Glaoua Mohammed Ibibt. The Glaoua were to play a big role in the Draa region.
In 1884 Charles de Foucauld visited Tamnougalt and observed that "it was the capital of the district, governed by the hereditary caid Abderrahman ben el Hassan" and that "it was exclusively inhabited by Draoua, like the whole Draa valley."
In 1907, Si Mohammed, caid of Tamnougalt offered his troops of Mezguita to defend the sultan Moulay Hafid against his brother.

In the twenties of the 20th century relations between the Glaoua and the Mezguita became more and more strained because of the struggle for the power over the Draa. For this purpose T'hami El Glaoui held a 'harka' to Tamnougalt in 1919. His cousin Hammou, the military leader of the family took Ksar Ait Hammou ou Saïd in the region of the Sedderat as his residence and began his advance on Tamnougalt. In 1923 he played the powerful Arab tribe of the Oulad Yahia against the Mezguita and in 1924 he finally decided to attack the village himself. With more than 5000 men and a Krupp cannon which the Glaoua had received from the sultan after the passage of sultan Hassan I by Tizni n Telouet in 1894. Hassan laid a siege on the village for 17 days. Finally they agreed to a pact.

References

External links
Jacques Gandini, "Agdz et l'histoire des caïds des Mezguita"  (retrieved 20-01-2019)

Kasbahs in Morocco
Populated places in Zagora Province